Lorenzo Clare Patterson (October 5, 1887 – March 28, 1913) was an outfielder in Major League Baseball. He played for the Cincinnati Reds in 1909.

References

External links

1887 births
1913 deaths
Major League Baseball outfielders
Cincinnati Reds players
Baseball players from Kansas
People from Arkansas City, Kansas
Guthrie Senators players
Fort Wayne Billikens players
Quincy Vets players
Oakland Oaks (baseball) players